Siderolamprus atitlanensis, the Atitlán galliwasp, is a species of lizard of the Diploglossidae family. It is found in Mexico, Guatemala, and El Salvador.

It was formerly classified in the genus Diploglossus, but was moved to Siderolamprus in 2021.

References

Siderolamprus
Reptiles described in 1950
Reptiles of Mexico
Reptiles of Guatemala
Reptiles of El Salvador
Taxa named by Hobart Muir Smith